Ebon Pond is a pond located in the southwestern extremity of the Brown Peninsula in Victoria Land. It was first studied on the ground by U.S. geologist Troy L. Pewe during U.S. Navy Operation Deepfreeze, 1957–58. It was so named by him because of the black volcanic terrain which entirely surrounds the pond.

References 

Lakes of Victoria Land
Scott Coast